The L&YR Class 2 (Aspinall) was a class of 4-4-0 steam locomotives of the Lancashire and Yorkshire Railway.

Design and construction
When Aspinall joined the L&YR in 1886 he was able to demonstrate to board needed 1,114 locomotives to operate the required 22¼ million annual mileage and was thus 151 short.

For express passenger engines Aspinall chose to stick with developing the L&YR Barton Wright 4-4-0 with  driving wheels.  To cope with the locomotive shortage and new route to Liverpool the L&YR ordered a further batch of 16 from Vulcan Foundry who had built the most recent order for 20.  Quoted at £1,830 they were delivered in 1887 and incorporated longer wheelbase, increased boiler pressure,  larger cylinders and bogie wheels of just over 3ft.

Aspinall had inspirations to increase the size of the driving wheels to with the objective achieve to speed advantages demonstrated by the GNR Stirling 4-2-2 and the LY&R Ramsbottom 2-4-0s.   These would come with the Aspinall 7ft3in 4-4-0s in 1891 as L&YR's own new Horwich Works came into operation.   In the interim a batch of 30 with 6 ft driving wheels were ordered from Beyer Peacock.  The L&YR had strong connections to Beyer Peacock at the time with John Ramsbottom being a both a consultant on the new Horwich Works and a director of Beyer Peacock.  The L&YR was able to negotiate a priced fixed at £1,990 for two years and to delay initial deliveries which both helped finances and enabled design refinements to the boiler and motion.

The Beyer Locomotives the L&YR standardized Joy valve gear, and equipped with the swing-link bogie. Other features such as  bogie wheels,  coupled wheelbase 160psi boiler were the same as the last batch from Vulcan Foundry.

Rebuilds and modifications
The supplied built-up chimneys were replace with the LY&R standard Horwich parallel type by 1900. Several had their boiler pressure increased to 180psi in the early 1900s but in all but three cases it was reduced back to 160psi by the grouping. Numbers 982, 999 and 1003 were rebuilt by George Hughes between 1910 and 1915 with saturated Belpaire firebox.  Some engines feature extended smokeboxs on saturated boilers. After World War I there was tendency to switch tenders with those of other classes and tender coal rails were seemingly randomly fitted although there does appear to be some logic pertaining to the particular duties an individual engine was expected to perform.

Service
Marshall notes the class were popular throughout their network.

The class were initially based mainly in Lancashire mainly working semi-fast passenger trains from Manchester, Colne, Liverpool, Southport, Blackpool and Bradford.  Bradford based engines were later displaced by Apsinalls 7ft3in 4-4-0s

29 passed to the London, Midland and Scottish Railway at the grouping in 1923.

Numbering

Withdrawal
The LMS, which soon moved to a Midland Derby bias, adopted a "scrap and build" as opposed to a "rebuild" engine policy and the Fowler 2P 4-4-0 being was as the LMS standard light passenger engine. Withdrawals began in 1930 and the last locomotive was withdrawn in 1935. None have been preserved.

Incidents
No 987 was hauling a Manchester to York passenger train composed of only three bogie coaches due to earlier operational problems. The train mistakenly routed onto the Burnley branch in dense fog conditions where it collided with pilot engine No. 809 pushing it  along on an uphill gradient. Both engines were badly damaged; all four locomotive crew were injured, two severely; and four passengers were also slightly injured.

Notes

References

Bibliography 

4-4-0 locomotives
02 (Aspinall)
Railway locomotives introduced in 1888
Scrapped locomotives